Argennina is a monotypic genus of North American cribellate araneomorph spiders in the family Dictynidae containing the single species, Argennina unica. It was first described by Willis J. Gertsch & S. Mulaik in 1936, and has only been found in Texas. The carapace is a pale yellow brown, sparsely covered with short black hairs, and the abdomen is gray to pale yellow with fine pale hairs.

References

Dictynidae
Monotypic Araneomorphae genera
Spiders of the United States